The Hum Award for Best Actor is an award presented annually by the Hum Television Network and Entertainment Channel (HTNEC). It is given in honor of an actor who has delivered an outstanding performance in a leading role while working within the Television industry. The 1st Hum Awards (for 2012) was held in 2013 with Noman Ejaz winning the award, who was honored for his role in Bari Aapa. 
The award has commonly been referred to as the hum for Best Actor Jury or Best Drama Actor Jury. Currently, nominees are determined by single transferable vote, within the actors and jury branch of HTNEC; winners are selected by a plurality vote from the entire eligible voting members of the Hum. This awards is equivalent to the Hum Award for Best Actor Popular, which is given in the ceremony but winners are solely  selected by viewers votings. Multiple nominations for an actor in same category but for different work is eligible. 
 
Since its inception the award has been given to three actors, while Noman Ejaz has received the most awards in this category with two consecutive Hum Awards. Ahsan Khan, Meekal Zulfiqar and Adnan Siddiqui were nominated each year more than any other actors. As of 2015 ceremony, Ahsan Khan is the most recent winner in this category for his role as Hashir in Mausam.

Winners and nominees
In the list below, winners are listed first in the colored row, followed by the other nominees. Following the hum's practice, the dramas below are listed by year of their Pakistan qualifying run, which is usually (but not always) the drama's year of release. As of the first ceremony, six Actors were nominated for the award. For the following years, five to six actors will be nominated for the award. In first ceremony six dramas nominated for category while all of the six nominee were also included for best director category with additional four extra nominees which were not included in best drama serial category.

For the first ceremony, the eligibility period spanned full calendar years. For example, the 1st Hum Awards presented on April 28, 2013, to recognized actors of dramas that were released between January, 2012, and December, 2012, the period of eligibility is the full previous calendar year from January 1 to December 31. However, this rule was subjected to change when at third year ceremony two (Sadqay Tumhare and Digest Writer) of seven nominated drama serials were running on TV at the time when nominations were announced. Date and the award ceremony shows that the 2010 is the period from 2010-2020 (10 years-decade), while the year above winners and nominees shows that the dramas year in which they were telecast, and the figure in bracket shows the ceremony number, for example; an award ceremony is held for the dramas of its previous year.

See also 
 Hum Awards
 Hum Awards pre-show
 List of Hum Awards Ceremonies
 Lux Style Award for Best TV Actor

References

External links
Official websites
 Hum Awards official website
 Hum Television Network and Entertainment Channel (HTNEC)
 Hum's Channel at YouTube (run by the Hum Television Network and Entertainment Channel)
 Hum Awards at Facebook (run by the Hum Television Network and Entertainment Channel)]

Hum Awards
Hum Award winners
Hum TV
Hum Network Limited